The Town of Eckley is a statutory town located in Yuma County, Colorado, United States. The town population was 232 at the 2020 United States Census.

History
A post office called Eckley has been in operation since the 1880s. The community derives its name from Adam Eckles, a rancher.

Geography
Eckley is located at  (40.111956, -102.488986).

Climate
According to the Köppen Climate Classification system, Eckley has a semi-arid climate, abbreviated "BSk" on climate maps.

Demographics

As of the census of 2000, there were 278 people, 100 households, and 66 families residing in the town. The racial makeup of the town was 85.25% White, 0.36% African American, 1.80% Native American, 10.79% from other races, and 1.80% from two or more races. Hispanic or Latino of any race were 19.42% of the population.

There were 100 households, out of which 45.0% had children under the age of 18 living with them, 54.0% were married couples living together, 9.0% had a female householder with no husband present, and 34.0% were non-families. 30.0% of all households were made up of individuals, and 13.0% had someone living alone who was 65 years of age or older.  The average household size was 2.78 and the average family size was 3.53.

In the town, the population was spread out, with 37.1% under the age of 18, 5.0% from 18 to 24, 29.1% from 25 to 44, 16.9% from 45 to 64, and 11.9% who were 65 years of age or older.  The median age was 32 years. For every 100 females, there were 98.6 males.  For every 100 females age 18 and over, there were 94.4 males.

The median income for a household in the town was $23,500, and the median income for a family was $26,250. Males had a median income of $27,500 versus $14,375 for females. The per capita income for the town was $11,194.  About 17.8% of families and 20.5% of the population were below the poverty line, including 29.9% of those under the age of eighteen and none of those 65 or over.

See also

Colorado
Bibliography of Colorado
Index of Colorado-related articles
Outline of Colorado
List of counties in Colorado
List of municipalities in Colorado
List of places in Colorado

References

External links

Town of Eckley website
CDOT map of the Town of Eckley

Towns in Yuma County, Colorado
Towns in Colorado